Douglas William Sutherland  (born 23 September 1932) is an Australian businessman, former Lord Mayor of the City of Sydney and Mayor of Burwood. Sutherland was a founding member of Australians for Constitutional Monarchy who was a delegate at the Australian Constitutional Convention 1998.

References

1932 births
Living people
Mayors and Lord Mayors of Sydney
Australian Labor Party mayors
Australian Labor Party councillors
Independent politicians in Australia
Australian monarchists
Australian accountants
Delegates to the Australian Constitutional Convention 1998
20th-century Australian politicians
Members of the Order of Australia
Mayors of places in New South Wales